Colin Dermot O'Dowd  (27 March 1966, Galway, Ireland) is an Irish physicist and atmospheric scientist.

Biography
O'Dowd matriculated in 1984 at NUI Galway, and graduated there in 1987 with a B.Sc. in physics. He received his Ph.D. in 1992 from UMIST (University of Manchester Institute of Science and Technology). He was from 1992 to 1996 a research associate at UMIST and from 1996 to 2001 a senior research fellow at the University of Sunderland. At the University of Helsinki, he was from 2000 to 2001 a senior scientist and from 2001 to 2002 a professor of physics. At NUI Galway, he was from 2001 to 2004 an adjunct professor of physics, from 2004 to 2005 a lecturer, and from 2006 to 2009 a senior lecturer and is since 2009 a personal (chair) professor of physics. There he is also the director of the Centre for Climate and Air Pollution Studies.

He has been, for a number of years, a highly-cited researcher and is the author or co-author of over 250 scientific publications. From 2000 to 2008 he was the co-editor-in-chief of the Journal of Geophysical Research (Section D: Atmospheres). He has done research on air-sea exchange, atmospheric composition, aerosols, and pollutants, climate change, and biogeochemical cycling.

O'Dowd was elected in 2002 a fellow of the Institute of Physics, in 2003 a fellow of the Royal Meteorological Society, in 2011 a member of the Royal Irish Academy, and in 2018 a member of Academia Europaea. He received in 2004 the Smoluchowski Award of the Gesellschaft für Aerosolforschung (German Association for Aerosol Science), in 2012 the Appleton Award of the Institute of Physics, in 2013 the Gold Medal in Geosciences of the Royal Irish Academy, and in 2016 the Mason Medal of the Royal Meteorological Society.

Selected publications
  1997
  2002 (April)
  2002 (June) (over 750 citations)
  2003
  2004 (over 900 citations)
  2006
  2007
  2008 (over 1650 citations)
  2009 (over 750 citations)
  2012

References

1966 births
Living people
People from Galway (city)
Irish physicists
Irish scientists
Alumni of the University of Galway
Alumni of the University of Manchester Institute of Science and Technology
Academics of the University of Galway
Fellows of the Institute of Physics
Members of Academia Europaea
Members of the Royal Irish Academy